Events from the year 1859 in the United States.

Incumbents

Federal Government 
 President: James Buchanan (D-Pennsylvania)
 Vice President: John C. Breckinridge (D-Kentucky)
 Chief Justice: Roger B. Taney (Maryland)
 Speaker of the House of Representatives: James Lawrence Orr (D-South Carolina)
 Congress: 35th (until March 4), 36th (starting March 4)

Events

January–March
 January 1 – Minting of Indian Head cent begins.
 January 10 – Lucy Cobb Institute opens in Athens, Georgia.
 January 28 – The city of Olympia is incorporated in the Territory of Washington.
 February 14 – Oregon is admitted as the 33rd U.S. state (see History of Oregon).

 February 27 – U.S. Congressman Daniel Sickles shoots dead Philip Barton Key for having an affair with his wife.
 March 2–3 – The Great Slave Auction, the largest single sale of slaves in U.S. history, with more than 400 people sold, takes place near Savannah, Georgia.
 March 21 – The Commonwealth of Pennsylvania issues the charter establishing the Zoological Society of Philadelphia, the first organization of its kind in the United States and founder of the nation's first zoo.

April–June
 June 8 – The discovery of the Comstock Lode in the western Utah Territory (present-day Nevada) sets off a rush of prospectors to the area.
 June 15 – The so-called Pig War border dispute between the Americans and the British on the San Juan Islands begins with the shooting of the namesake pig; the episode is resolved in October without human bloodshed.

July–September
 July – Pike's Peak Gold Rush begins in the Colorado Territory.
 July 1 – The first intercollegiate baseball game is played, between Amherst and Williams Colleges.
 August 27 – Edwin Drake drills the first oil well in the United States, near Titusville, Pennsylvania, starting the Pennsylvanian oil rush.
 September – Joshua Abraham Norton proclaims himself "Emperor of the United States" in San Francisco.

October–December

 October 16 – Militant abolitionist leader John Brown raids the Harpers Ferry Armory in Harper's Ferry, Virginia, in an unsuccessful bid to spark a general slave rebellion.
 October 18 –  Troops under Colonel Robert E. Lee overpower John Brown at the Federal arsenal.
 November 1 – The current Cape Lookout, North Carolina, lighthouse is lighted for the first time (its first-order Fresnel lens can be seen for 19 miles).
 December 2 – John Brown is hanged at Charles Town, West Virginia for his October 16 raid on Harpers Ferry.

Undated
 The Rancho Rincon de Los Esteros Land Grant is confirmed to Rafael Alvisa (part of modern-day Santa Clara County, California).
 The University of Michigan Law School is founded.
 Approximate date – The song Dixie is written, probably by Dan Emmett.

Ongoing
 Bleeding Kansas (1854–1860)

Births
 January 6 – Duncan U. Fletcher, U.S. Senator from Florida from 1909 to 1936 (died 1936)
 January 9 – Carrie Chapman Catt, women's suffrage leader (died 1947)
 January 12 – Henry Heitfeld, U.S. Senator from Idaho from 1897 to 1903 (died 1938)
 January 25 – Lillie Eginton Warren, American educator (year of death unknown)
 February 6 – Elias Disney, farmer, father of Walt Disney (died 1941)
 February 22 – Samuel D. Nicholson, U.S. Senator from Colorado from 1921 to 1923 (died 1923)
 February 25 – John Burke, 24th Treasurer of the United States (died 1937)
 March 12 – Abraham H. Cannon, Mormon apostle (died 1896)
 March 21 – Abbie Pratt, golfer (died 1938 in France)
 April 12 – Junius George Groves, slave-born potato farmer (died 1925)
 May 12 – William Alden Smith, U.S. Senator from Michigan from 1907 to 1919 (died 1932)
 June 29 – Margaret Ashmore Sudduth, educator, editor and temperance advocate (died 1957)
 July 13 – Marion Manville Pope, author (died 1930)
 July 31 – Theobald Smith, bacteriologist (died 1934)
 August 15 – Charles Comiskey, baseball baseman, manager and owner (died 1931)
 August 28 – Matilda Howell, archer (died 1938)
 September 16 – Frank R. Gooding, U.S. Senator from Idaho from 1921 to 1928 (died 1928)
 September 17 – Billy The Kid, Old West gunfighter (died 1881)
 October 20 – John Dewey, educator born in Vermont (died 1952)
 November 1 – Charles Brantley Aycock, 50th Governor of North Carolina (died 1912)
 December 20 – Adaline Hohf Beery, songbook compiler (died 1929)

Deaths

 January 28 – William H. Prescott, Hispanist historian (born 1796)
 January 29 – William Cranch Bond, astronomer (born 1789)
 February 25 – Edward A. Hannegan, U.S. Senator from Indiana from 1843 to 1849 (born 1807)
 February 27 – Philip Barton Key II, United States Attorney for the District of Columbia, murdered (born 1818)
 March 19 – Oliver H. Smith, U.S. Senator from Indiana from 1837 to 1843 (born 1794)
 March 30 – James Matthews Legaré, poet and inventor (born 1823)
 April 14 – George M. Bibb, U.S. Senator from Kentucky from 1811 to 1814 (born 1776)
 June 8 – Walter Hunt, inventor (born 1796)
 July 30 – Richard Rush, 8th United States Attorney General and 8th United States Secretary of the Treasury (born 1780)
 August 2 – Horace Mann, educator and abolitionist (born 1796)
 August 15 – Nathaniel Claiborne, politician (born 1777)
 September 2 – Delia Bacon, playwright and writer on the Shakespeare authorship question (born 1811)
 September 16 – David C. Broderick, U.S. Senator from California from 1857 to 1859 (born 1820)
 November 28 – Washington Irving, author (born 1783)
 December 2 – John Brown, abolitionist, hanged (born 1800)

See also
Timeline of United States history (1820–1859)

References

External links
 

 
1850s in the United States
United States
United States
Years of the 19th century in the United States